Clivina stefaniana is a species of ground beetle in the subfamily Scaritinae. It was described by Josef Müller under the name "Giuseppe Müller" in 1942.

References

stefaniana
Beetles described in 1942